Saxinis apicalis is a species of case-bearing leaf beetles in the family Chrysomelidae. It is found in Central America and North America.

References

 Riley, Edward G., Shawn M. Clark, and Terry N. Seeno (2003). "Catalog of the leaf beetles of America north of Mexico (Coleoptera: Megalopodidae, Orsodacnidae and Chrysomelidae, excluding Bruchinae)". Coleopterists Society Special Publication no. 1, 290.

Further reading

 Arnett, R. H. Jr., M. C. Thomas, P. E. Skelley and J. H. Frank. (eds.). (21 June 2002). American Beetles, Volume II: Polyphaga: Scarabaeoidea through Curculionoidea. CRC Press LLC, Boca Raton, Florida .
 
 Richard E. White. (1983). Peterson Field Guides: Beetles. Houghton Mifflin Company.

Clytrini
Beetles described in 1884